Sibel Kekilli (born 16 June 1980) is a German actress. She gained public attention after starring in the 2004 film Head-On. She won two Lolas, the most prestigious German film awards, for her performances in Head-On and When We Leave (2010). Beginning in 2011, she became more widely known for her role as Shae in the HBO series Game of Thrones.

Early life
Kekilli was born and raised in Heilbronn, to a family of Turkish origin. Her parents came to Germany from Turkey in 1977, and were described by Kekilli as having a rather modern and open attitude. After completing school with excellent grades at age 16, she entered a 30-month-long combined training program to become a certified public administration specialist at the local city administration.

After successful completion of the training program, she continued to work as an administrative assistant for another two years at Heilbronn city hall, then moved to Essen, where she worked various jobs as a bouncer, cleaner, waitress, nightclub manager, saleswoman, and pornographic film actress.

Career 
In 2001–2002, over a period of six months, Kekilli appeared in a number of pornographic films for various directors including Josef Baumberger and Harry S. Morgan. Her stage name was Dilara.
In 2002, while at a shopping mall in Cologne, she was noticed by a casting director, who invited her to audition for a role in a film. She won the leading part in Head-On against a field of 350 other hopefuls. The film was released in 2004 and was a major success, receiving several prizes at film festivals. Filming proved strenuous for Kekilli personally, and she underwent an appendectomy during filming in Turkey.

Shortly after the release of Head-On, the German tabloid newspaper Bild made public Kekilli's earlier work in pornography. This led to a public sensation, and Kekilli's parents broke off all contact with her. She received the 2004 Bambi prize for "best shooting star" for her role in Head-On. During the televised acceptance speech, she tearfully complained that she was being subject to a "dreckige Hetzkampagne" ("dirty smear campaign") and "Medienvergewaltigung" ("media rape"). Bild-Zeitung was later reprimanded by the Deutscher Presserat (German Press Council) for the manner in which it covered the story.

Kekilli starred in the Turkish coup d'état film Home Coming (Eve Dönüş) (2006), playing the wife of a man who was unjustly imprisoned and tortured. The performance won her the Best Actress award at the 2006 Antalya Golden Orange Film Festival. Also that year, she played a Jewish woman on the way to the Auschwitz concentration camp in the 2006 film The Last Train. In 2009, she played Umay, a young Turkish woman who leaves Istanbul to return to her family in Berlin, in When We Leave (Die Fremde). She was awarded the Lola for Best Actress in 2010 for her role. In 2010, Kekilli was cast as Shae in HBO's Game of Thrones, an adaptation of George R. R. Martin's A Song of Ice and Fire novels.

In 2011, one year after first appearing in a supporting role in the long-running crime series Tatort, she became a permanent cast member as new investigator Sarah Brandt, working alongside chief investigator Klaus Borowski. She said that she was glad not to be playing a character of foreign descent, as she feels she has been typecast in the past. In 2017 she left the Tatort franchise, after 14 feature-length episodes, citing a need for change.

Personal life
Kekilli lives in Hamburg.

Since citizenship in Germany is primarily established by Jus sanguinis rather than Jus soli, she originally held Turkish rather than German citizenship, and had to apply to the Turkish government when she sought a marriage license (for a planned marriage that ultimately did not take place).

In 2017, she blocked her Instagram account from being accessed in Turkey, saying that users from that country had sent a multitude of abusive and threatening messages. Kekilli denounced the senders as "bigoted, hypocrites and full of hate".

Political activism
Kekilli supports the organization Terre des Femmes in its work against violence against women.

In December 2006, at an anti-domestic violence event run by the Turkish newspaper Hürriyet in Berlin, she stated, in German, the equivalent of "I have experienced for myself that both physical and psychological abuse are regarded as normal in a Muslim family. Sadly, violence is part of the cultural heritage in Islam." In response, the Turkish consul general left the room.

In March 2015 at an International Women's Day event at the President of Germany's residence at Schloss Bellevue, Kekilli gave a speech on violence against women in the name of honour. The speech drew wide attention and praise in Germany for its empathic message. In May 2015, Friedrich Naumann Foundation named Kekilli "Author of Freedom" for the speech.

Filmography

Film

Television

Awards
 2004 Lola for Best Actress in Head-On
 2004 Bambi for Best "Shooting Star" in Head-On
 2006 Golden Orange Prize for Best Actress in Home Coming
 2010 Lola for Best Actress in When We Leave
 2010 Tribeca Prize for Best Actress in When We Leave

References

External links

1980 births
Living people
Best Actress Golden Orange Award winners
Best Actress German Film Award winners
German people of Turkish descent
German pornographic film actresses
21st-century German actresses
People from Heilbronn
German television actresses
German film actresses
Former Muslims turned agnostics or atheists
German atheists
German former Muslims
Recipients of the Cross of the Order of Merit of the Federal Republic of Germany